Baccharis albida is a species of flowering plant in the family Asteraceae and is an endemic to Argentina. 

Baccharis albida is a perennial shrub that grows up to 1.7 metres high. The plant grows between 0 and 500 metres elevation and is found in the following provinces of Argentina: Buenos Aires, Chaco,  Corrientes, Entre Ríos and Santa Fe.

References

Shrubs
albida